Nikkita R. Oliver is an American lawyer, non-profit administrator, educator, poet, and politician. They were a candidate for Mayor of Seattle in the 2017 mayoral election, but finished third in the primary with 17% of the vote. Oliver was defeated again in an at-large Seattle city council race in 2021.

Oliver was a leader in the Black Lives Matter, civil rights, and criminal justice reform movements in Seattle, before relocating to Detroit in 2022.

Early life and education

Oliver was born in Indianapolis to a white mother and black father.

Oliver attended Seattle Pacific University and earned a degree in sociology in 2008. At Seattle Pacific, Oliver became involved with student government and led a racial justice campaign called "Catalyst". Oliver also became involved with the local Black Lives Matter organization. Oliver earned a Juris Doctor from the University of Washington School of Law in 2015 and Master of Education from the University of Washington College of Education in 2016.

Career
Oliver worked for the American Civil Liberties Union, as an intervention specialist, and as a chaplain at the Youth Detention Center. In 2015, Oliver was awarded the Artist Human Rights Leader Award by the City of Seattle's Human Rights Commission.

2017 mayoral campaign

Oliver declared their candidacy for mayor of Seattle in March 2017, expecting to run against incumbent mayor Ed Murray, though he resigned due to multiple allegations of sexual assault before the election. Oliver announced they would be representing the "Peoples Party of Seattle", a collection of community and civic leaders, lawyers, artists, activists and teachers that began organizing after the 2016 presidential election. At the time, Oliver was a part-time teacher at Washington Middle School and Franklin Middle School and provided mostly pro-bono services as an attorney. Oliver also worked for Creative Justice, an arts-based alternative to incarceration. Oliver's campaign focused on a "radical rethinking of criminal justice investments, revisiting the city’s housing proposals to extract more from developers for affordable housing; slowing gentrification, and examining an even higher minimum wage than the recent landmark achievement of $15 an hour." Oliver also brought attention to issues like homelessness, institutional racism, and poverty.

Criminal justice reform efforts
Oliver has worked as an organizer for Seattle’s No Youth Jail and Black Lives Matter movements. They work as co-director of Creative Justice Northwest, a nonprofit organization that offers programs to youth most impacted by the school-to-prison pipeline. Following the murder of George Floyd in Minneapolis, Minnesota, Oliver helped organize and spoke at numerous protests in Seattle. During a closed-door meeting with Mayor Jenny Durkan, Police Chief Carmen Best, and other community leaders, Oliver live-streamed the discussion. Oliver has been an advocate for de-funding the police and civic investment in community-based public health and public safety strategies.

Oliver has also spoken about outside spending on local political campaigns. In 2017, Oliver was named one of Seattle's Most Influential Seattlelites by Seattle Magazine. Oliver co-drafted a resolution for Seattle’s divestment from the Dakota Access Pipeline in 2017.

In January 2020, Oliver was featured as the keynote speaker for the Dr. Martin Luther King Jr. Day celebration at Edmonds Community College. They have been featured as a guest lecturer and speaker at the University of Michigan, Reed College, the Stanley Ann Dunham Scholarship Fund, KTCS 9, Pod Save the People, and Town Hall Seattle.

2021 City Council campaign 
In March 2021, Oliver declared their candidacy for Seattle City Council position 9, but was defeated.

Detroit Justice Center 
In July 2022, the Detroit Justice Center announced that Oliver had joined the organization as an Associate Executive Director of Programs & Strategy, and would be relocating to Detroit.

Personal life
Oliver identifies as queer and uses they/them pronouns. They are genderfluid.

Further reading
 LaVine, Matt (2020), Race, Gender, and the History of Early Analytic Philosophy, Rowman & Littlefield, 
 Delpit, Lisa (2019), Teaching When the World Is on Fire, 
 The Routledge History of World Peace Since 1750, Taylor & Francis,

References

External links

 
 Ted X Seattle: Nikkita Oliver
 
 

1986 births
20th-century African-American writers
20th-century American poets
21st-century African-American women
21st-century American lawyers
21st-century American poets
21st-century American politicians
21st-century American women politicians
Activists for African-American civil rights
African-American lawyers
African-American women lawyers
Black Lives Matter people
Candidates in the 2017 United States elections
Candidates in the 2021 United States elections
Criminal justice reform in the United States
Housing reformers
LGBT African Americans
LGBT lawyers
LGBT people from Washington (state)
American LGBT politicians
Living people
Members of the Democratic Socialists of America
Non-binary activists
Poets from Indiana
Politicians from Indianapolis
Politicians from Seattle
Queer people
Seattle Pacific University alumni
Seattle University faculty
University of Washington College of Education alumni
University of Washington School of Law alumni
20th-century African-American women writers
20th-century American women writers
Genderfluid people
American non-binary writers